Electron tube may refer to:
 Vacuum tube, a device that controls electric current between electrodes
 Gas-filled tube, an arrangement of electrodes in a gas